General The Honourable Sir Alexander Hamilton-Gordon  (11 December 1817 – 18 May 1890), was a Scottish soldier and Liberal Party politician.

Military career
Hamilton-Gordon was the second son of Prime Minister George Hamilton-Gordon, 4th Earl of Aberdeen, by his second marriage to Harriet, daughter of the Hon. John Douglas. Arthur Hamilton-Gordon, 1st Baron Stanmore, was his younger brother. He served in the British Army and saw action at the Battle of Balaclava in October 1854 during the Crimean War. He went on to be General Officer Commanding Eastern District in January 1872.

Apart from his military career he was also an Honorary Equerry to Queen Victoria and sat as Member of Parliament for Aberdeenshire East between 1875 and 1885.

Hamilton-Gordon married Caroline Emilia Mary, daughter of Margaret and Sir John Herschel, 1st Baronet and grand daughter of astronomer William Herschel, in 1852. They had five sons and four daughters. His eldest son Alexander also became a successful soldier. Hamilton-Gordon died in May 1890, aged 72. Lady Hamilton-Gordon survived him by 19 years and died in January 1909.

See also
Marquess of Aberdeen and Temair

Notes

References
Kidd, Charles, Williamson, David (editors). Debrett's Peerage and Baronetage (1990 edition). New York: St Martin's Press, 1990,

External links 
 

|-

1817 births
1890 deaths
British Army generals
Knights Commander of the Order of the Bath
Scottish Liberal Party MPs
Members of the Parliament of the United Kingdom for Scottish constituencies
UK MPs 1874–1880
UK MPs 1880–1885
Younger sons of earls
Children of prime ministers of the United Kingdom